The  class was a class of Japanese midget submarines (Kō-hyōteki) used during World War II. They had hull numbers but no names. For simplicity, they are most often referred to by the hull number of the mother submarine. Thus, the midget carried by I-16-class submarine was known as I-16's boat, or "I-16tou."

History

Fifty were built. The "A Target" name was assigned as a ruse: if their design were prematurely discovered by Japan's foes, the Japanese Navy could insist that the vessels were battle practice targets.

The first two, No.1 and No.2, were used only in testing. They did not have conning towers, which were added to the later boats for stability under water.

Most of the other fifty are unaccounted for, although three were captured in Sydney (Australia), and others in Guam, Guadalcanal, and Kiska Island, accounting for some of the other hull numbers.

The submarines were each armed with two 450 mm (17.7 in.) torpedoes in muzzle-loading tubes one above the other at the bow. Some have stated that a version of the Type 91 torpedo, designed for aircraft launching, was used, but other reports indicate that the Type 97 torpedo was modified to the Type 98, otherwise known as the Type 97 special. There is no definitive information that the Type 91 was used. The Type 98 was later supplanted by the Type 02 torpedo. There was also a demolition charge which has been suggested was large enough to enable the submarine to be used as a suicide weapon, but there is no evidence that it was ever used as one.

Each submarine had a crew of two men. A junior officer conned the boat while a petty officer manipulated valves and moved ballast to control trim and diving.

Pearl Harbor attack

Five of these boats participated in the Pearl Harbor attack, with possibly two actually making it into the harbor. Secret war records show that submarine crews had been ordered to scuttle their subs after the attack and provisions were made to recover stranded crews. Of the five used at Pearl Harbor, No.19 was captured with its pilot Kazuo Sakamaki where it grounded on the east side of Oahu. During World War II, No.19 was put on tour across the United States to help sell War Bonds. Now a U.S. National Historic Landmark, No.19 is an exhibit at the National Museum of the Pacific War in Fredericksburg, Texas.

A second Pearl Harbor midget submarine, No.18, was located by U.S. Navy divers and US Marine Divers in training including Laurence McInnis and Fred Stock of A Company, 3rd Recon Battalion, off Keehi Lagoon east of the Pearl Harbor entrance on 13 June 1960. The submarine had been damaged by a depth charge attack and abandoned by its crew before it could fire its torpedoes. This submarine was restored and placed on display at the Naval Academy Etajima 15 March 1962.

It was visited at approximately 6:30 am local time, by an Okeanos explorer ROV, on 7 December 2016, 75 years after it was sunk.

Both of those torpedoes missed and are believed to have hit a dock at Pearl City and the shore of Ford Island. This submarine was sunk by Monaghan at 8:43 a.m. on 7 December and later recovered and used as fill during construction of a new landside pier at the Pearl Harbor submarine base. The hulk was uncovered again in 1952 but was so badly corroded by chlorine gas from the electrical batteries that it was again reburied at the same location. The crew's remains are still entombed in the submarine.

In 1992, 2000, and 2001, Hawaii Undersea Research Laboratory's submersibles found the wreck of a midget sub lying in three parts three miles south of the Pearl Harbor entrance. The wreck was in the debris field where much surplus U.S. equipment was dumped from the West Loch Disaster of 1944, including vehicles and landing craft. In 2009, a research team assembled by the PBS television series Nova positively identified the sub as being the last, No.16, of the 5 Ko-Hyoteki that participated in the 7 December 1941, attack, plioted by Ensign Masaji Yokoyama and Petty Officer 2nd Class Sadamu Kamita. Both of its torpedoes were missing, indicating that the midget sub may have fired its torpedoes prior to its sinking. Although this correlates with reports of two torpedoes fired at the light cruiser  at 10:04 at the entrance of Pearl Harbor, and a possible torpedo fired at destroyer  at 08:21, there is circumstantial evidence to support a hypothesis that No.16, like No.22, successfully entered Pearl, fired its torpedoes at Battleship Row, and fled to the relative quiet of neighboring West Loch, where it was scuttled by its crew. When a series of explosions sank an amphibious fleet being assembled in the Loch in 1944, it is believed the remains of the sub were collected and dumped in the subsequent salvage operation, which was kept classified as secret until 1960. A photograph taken from a Japanese plane during the Pearl Harbor attack shows what might have been No.16 inside the harbor firing its torpedoes at Battleship Row. The sinking of the USS West Virginia and capsizing of the  may have been accelerated by a torpedo hit from a submarine-launched torpedo, the warheads of which were larger than the aerial torpedoes. Some believe that in the photo, where the torpedoes' paths had supposedly started, were sprays that indicated a midget-submarine rocking up and down due to the force of the torpedo being launched, causing the propellers of the stern to be exposed, kicking up clouds of water spray. A war time report from Admiral Nimitz confirmed the recovery of at least one dud torpedo of the type employed by the midget submarines. Japanese forces received a radio message from a midget submarine at 00:41 on 8 December claiming damage to one or more large warships inside Pearl Harbor. At 22:41 on 7 December, they received a message from No. 16 describing the air attack on Pearl Harbor as successful, and at 00:51 on 8 December they received another message that read "Unable to navigate." They never heard from No. 16 again. This discovery is covered in the Nova episode Killer Subs in Pearl Harbor and companion website, I-16tou.com.

Attacks on Sydney 

On the night of 29 May 1942, five large Japanese submarines positioned themselves 56 kilometres north-east of Sydney Heads. At 3 a.m. the next day one of the submarines launched a reconnaissance aircraft. After circling Sydney Harbour the aircraft returned to its submarine, reporting the presence of 'battleships and cruisers' moored in the harbour. The flotilla's commanding officer decided to attack the harbour with midget submarines the next night. The next day the five submarines approached to within 11 kilometres of Sydney Heads, and at about 4:30 p.m. they released three midget submarines, which then began their approach to Sydney Harbour.

The outer-harbour defences detected the entry of the first midget submarine, No.14, at about 8 pm, but it was not identified until it became entangled in an anti-torpedo net that was suspended between George's Head and Green Point. Before HMAS Yarroma was able to open fire, the submarine's two crew members destroyed their vessel with demolition charges and killed themselves.

The second submarine, No.24b, entered the harbour at about 9.48 p.m. and headed west towards the Sydney Harbour Bridge, causing a general alarm to be issued by the Naval Officer in Charge, Sydney. About 200 metres from Garden Island the submarine was fired on by the heavy cruiser . The submarine then fired its two torpedoes at the cruiser. One torpedo ran ashore on Garden Island, but failed to explode. The other passed under the Dutch submarine K9 and struck the harbour bed beneath the depot ship HMAS Kuttabul where it exploded, killing 21 sailors (19 Royal Australian Navy and 2 Royal Navy). The submarine then slipped out of the harbour, its mission complete, and disappeared. Its wreck was located, about 30 km north of the harbour and 5 km to seaward, in November 2006. It is now protected as a war grave.

The third submarine, No.21, was sighted by HMAS Yandra at the entrance to the harbour and was depth-charged. Some four hours later, having recovered, it entered the harbour, but it was subsequently attacked with depth charges and sunk in Taylor Bay by vessels of the Royal Australian Navy. Both members of the submarine's crew committed suicide.

The two submarines that were recovered were identical, and their remains were used to reconstruct a complete submarine, which toured New South Wales, Victoria and South Australia before being delivered to the Australian War Memorial in Canberra in 1943, where it remains on display.

Attacks on Madagascar 

On 29 May 1942, the Japanese submarines I-10, I-16 and I-20 arrived at Madagascar. I-10s reconnaissance plane spotted Revenge-class battleship  at anchor in Diego Suarez harbor but the plane was spotted and Ramillies changed her berth. I-20 and I-16 launched two midget submarines, one of which managed to enter the harbor and fired two torpedoes while under depth charge attack from two corvettes. One torpedo seriously damaged Ramillies, while the second sank the 6,993 ton oil tanker British Loyalty (later refloated). Ramillies was later repaired in Durban and Plymouth.

The crew of one of the submarines, Lieutenant Saburo Akieda and Petty Officer Masami Takemoto, beached their submarine (No.20b) at Nosy Antalikely and moved inland towards their pick-up point near Cape Amber. They were informed upon when they bought food at a village and both were killed in a firefight with Royal Marines three days later. The second midget submarine, No.16b, was lost at sea and the body of one of its crew was found washed ashore a day later.

Characteristics

{| class="wikitable" width="90%"
|-
|+according to Rekishi Gunzō
! width="15%" colspan="2"| Type
! width="16%" | First prototype
! width="16%" | Second prototype (Prod. No. 1–2)
! width="16%" | Type A (Prod. No. 3–52)
! width="16%" | Type B (Prod. No. 49–53)
! width="16%" | Type C (Prod. No. 54–100)
|-
! colspan="2"| Displacementsubmerged
| 
| 
| 
| 
| 
|-
! colspan="2"| Length (overall)
| 
| 
| 
| 
| 
|-
! colspan="2"| Beam
| 
| 
| 
| 
| 
|-
! colspan="2"| Draft
| 
| 
| 
| 
| 
|-
! colspan="2"| Draught
| 
| 
| 
| 
| 
|-
! colspan="2"| Propulsion
| 224 × Type 'B' special rechargeable batteries,electric motor (600 bhp),single shaft,contra-rotating propellers
| 224 × Type 'D' special rechargeable batteries,electric motor (600 bhp),single shaft,contra-rotating propellers
| 224 × Type 'D' special rechargeable batteries,electric motor (600 bhp),single shaft,contra-rotating propellers
| 224 × Type 'D' special rechargeable batteries,electric motor (600 bhp),1 × electric generator (40 bhp),single shaft,contra-rotating propellers
| 208 × Type 'D' special rechargeable batteries,electric motor (600 bhp),1 × electric generator (40 bhp),single shaft,contra-rotating propellers
|-
! rowspan="2"|Speed
! Surfaced
| no data
| no data
| no data
| 
| 
|-
! Submerged
| 
| 
| 
| 
| 
|-
! rowspan="2"|Range
! Surfaced
| no data
| no data
| no data
|  at 
|  at 
|-
! Submerged
| no data
| no data
|-
! colspan="2"| Test depth
| 
| 
| 
| 
| 
|-
! colspan="2"| crew
| 2
| 2
| 2
| 2
| 3
|-
! colspan="2"| Armament
| 2 ×  Type 89 torpedoes
| 2 ×  Type 97 torpedoes
| 2 ×  Type 97 torpedoes, later replaced Type 2 Torpedo
| 2 ×  Type 2 torpedoes
| 2 ×  Type 2 torpedoes
|-
! colspan="2"| Builder
| Kure Naval Arsenal
| Kure Naval Arsenal
| Karasukojima Naval Armory (Production number 3–20)'P' (Ōurasaki) Naval Armory (Production number 21–52)
| 'P' Naval Armory
| 'P' Naval Armory
|-
! colspan="2"| Number built
| 1
| 2
| 50Production number 49–52 were rebuilt to the Type 'B''' in 1943, some boats rebuilt to the Type 'A' trainer.
| 5Production number 49–52 were rebuilt from the Type 'A'.
| 47Approx. 10 boats were rebuilt to the Type 'C' trainer.
|-
! colspan="2"| Building period
| 1932–1933
| 1938–1940
| 1940–1943
| 1943
| 1943–1944
|}

Survivors

There are the remains of one  in the open at Kiska in the Aleutian Islands, and some in the waters nearby.

There are four reasonably intact Type A midgets on display in the world:
 HA-8 – Submarine Force Library and Museum, Groton, Connecticut
 HA-18 – JMSDF Etajima Naval Base, Etajima, Japan
 HA-19 – National Museum of the Pacific War, Fredericksburg, Texas
 A composite of two that entered the Sydney harbor in May 1942 – Australian War Memorial, Canberra, Australia

A third such submarine used in the attack at Sydney  has been found, but remains in the waters off Sydney, to be left in situ as a war grave.

References
Notes

Bibliography
 Pearl Harbor – Attack from Below Naval History, December 1999
 Ha-19 (Midget Submarine, 1938–1941)
 Pearl Harbor Attacked
 Midget submarine attack on Sydney
 I-16tou.com
 
 Midget Submarines at Diego Suarez, Madagascar 1942
 Rekishi Gunzō, History of the Pacific War Vol. 35, Kō-hyōteki and Kōryū'', Gakken (Tokyo, Japan), 2002, .

External links 

 David Stubblebine: Type A-class Midget Submarine, Type B, Type C, Type D

Submarine classes
 
Midget submarines
Ko-hyoteki
World War II submarines of Japan